Vlasyevskaya is a rural locality (a village) in Afanasyevskoye Rural Settlement of Verkhnetoyemsky District, Arkhangelsk Oblast, Russia. The population was 57 as of 2010.

Geography 
Vlasyevskaya is located on the Yumizh River, 46 km northwest of Verkhnyaya Toyma (the district's administrative centre) by road. Alexeyevskaya is the nearest rural locality.

References 

Rural localities in Verkhnetoyemsky District